Staraya Otrada is a rural locality (a selo) and the administrative centre of Otradinsky Selsoviet, Kuyurgazinsky District, Bashkortostan, Russia. The population was 529 as of 2010. There are 4 streets.

Geography 
Staraya Otrada is located 18 km south of Yermolayevo (the district's administrative centre) by road. Savelyevka is the nearest rural locality.

References 

Rural localities in Kuyurgazinsky District